Fort Chilcotin was a short-lived trading post of the Hudson's Bay Company, located at the confluence of the Chilko and Chilcotin Rivers, British Columbia,   Canada. It operated between the years 1836 and 1844.  A commercial failure due to the lack of interest in the company merchandise shown by the Tsilhqot'in people, its operations were moved north to Fort Kluskus in Dakelh Territory.
Today, the site where the fort used to stand is colloquially known as "Hudson's Bay Flats" - remembered particularly by the Tsilhqot'in (via oral history) as the site where, during the Chilcotin War, Lhats'as?in and the other Tsilhqot'in war chiefs were wrongfully arrested under a flag of truce for murder.

See also
Chilcotin War
Canadian Forces Camp Chilcotin (sometimes referred to as Fort Chilcotin, and in the same general vicinity)

References
"North West Company page, Fraser's Expedition", City of Quesnel website
Chilcotin War Timeline, "We Do Not Know His Name", Great Unsolved Mysteries in Canadian history website

Pre-Confederation British Columbia
Fur trade
Chilcotin Country
Tsilhqot'in
Hudson's Bay Company forts
1836 establishments in Canada
Ghost towns in British Columbia